Thomas Gomez (July 10, 1905 – June 18, 1971) was an American actor.

Life and career

Spanish on his father (Sabino Tomás Gómez)'s side (Gibraltar and Santander, Spain) and French-Irish on his mother's side (Alsace and County Cork), Gomez's parents migrated to New York City shortly before his birth in 1905 as Sabino Tomás Gómez (or Sabino Tomas Gomez or Thomas Sabino Gomez). 

He began his acting career in theater in 1923, studying under actor Walter Hampden in a production of Cyrano de Bergerac in Syracuse, New York. He made his first film Sherlock Holmes and the Voice of Terror in 1942 and by the end of his career had appeared in sixty films.

Gomez was the first Spanish-American to be nominated for an Academy Award when he received this accolade for his performance in the 1947 film Ride the Pink Horse. Directed by and starring Robert Montgomery, it was later used as the basis for an episode of the same name for the television series Robert Montgomery Presents in which Gomez reprised his role.

His other film roles include Who Done It? (1942), Key Largo (1948), Force of Evil (1948), The Conqueror (1956) and his final film Beneath the Planet of the Apes (1970).  A frequent performer on television, Gomez also appeared in guest roles in such series as The Twilight Zone, Route 66, Dr. Kildare, Mr. Ed, Burke's Law, The Virginian, It Takes a Thief, Bewitched, The Rifleman, and Gunsmoke.

Gomez had many notable stage roles, such as the one in the original Broadway run of A Man for All Seasons. Billboard lauded the "humanity and finely effective detail of his character work" in the short-running 1942 Broadway play The Flowers of Virtue. In 1956, he replaced Burl Ives as Big Daddy in the original Broadway production of Tennessee Williams's Cat on a Hot Tin Roof.

Thomas Gomez died at St. John's Hospital in Santa Monica, California, aged 65, after spending 3 weeks in a coma. He was interred in the Westwood Village Memorial Park Cemetery in Los Angeles.

Filmography

References

External links

 
 

1905 births
1971 deaths
20th-century American male actors
American male film actors
American people of Spanish descent
Burials at Westwood Village Memorial Park Cemetery
Male actors from New York City
Road incident deaths in California